Blackwoods is a 2001 psychological thriller film, directed by Uwe Boll and starring Patrick Muldoon and Clint Howard. It is set in the titular Blackwoods.

Plot
Matt Sullivan (Patrick Muldoon) is haunted to the point of mental instability by his guilt over the death of a girl named Molly in a car accident he caused years ago. Driving drunk after an argument with his girlfriend, he was distracted by the car radio and fatally struck the girl as she crossed the road.

Years later, Matt goes away for weekend with his new girlfriend Dawn (Keegan Connor Tracy) to the Blackwoods of Colorado. During a stopover in a small town Matt and Dawn have lunch at a local diner, where he notices several of the locals staring oddly at the two of them. On the road, Matt is pulled over by Sheriff Harding (Michael Paré), who asks Matt who he is and what he is doing passing through the town. After Matt explains about his private getaway, Sheriff Harding lets him go.

Matt checks into a local motel where he interacts with the debauched motel clerk and owner Greg (Clint Howard), who tries to overcharge him for his room for the night. Later, after a wild session of lovemaking, Dawn goes for a walk. While she is away a strange man with an axe comes into the motel room and attacks Matt, who escapes and calls the police. Sheriff Harding shows up and, after finding no one around, openly suspects Matt of having ulterior motives for visiting the Blackwoods, but without any hard evidence he cannot arrest him. Matt phones his friend Jim, telling him of Dawn's disappearance and asking for help before setting out to look for her.

In the woods, Matt is attacked and captured by a rural family, the Franklins, who restrain him and put on a mock trial to try him for the death of the young girl he killed years prior. Dawn emerges and reveals that she is the twin sister of Molly, and that she lured him here for revenge. Matt is found guilty by the Franklins, and is sentenced to be turned loose in the forest for the family to hunt down; he flees into the woods, his sanity weakening further as he goes.

Matt manages to ambush and kill two of the family members, Jack and John, pursuing him through the woods. Jim appears, having tracked Matt down, and tries to talk to his friend when Matt unexpectedly attacks and kills him, believing that he too is in league with the Franklin family. It is revealed that Dawn and the Franklins never existed, and that Matt's every interaction with them had been part of a delusion his guilt-ridden mind created to deal with the strain of his past.

Sheriff Harding follows some clues from Matt into the woods and to the old Franklin house, which is abandoned and in disrepair (confirming that Matt's "trial" was indeed a hallucination). The sheriff finds Jim's dead body and then chases after Matt. The chase ends with Matt running blindly into traffic and being killed by a speeding truck.

The final scene shows Sheriff Harding telling his story to the waitress at the local diner, telling how Matt's mental instability led to him dreaming up this waking nightmare about Dawn and the Franklins.

Cast

Release
The film was released direct-to-video on September 3, 2002, in North America.

Critical reception
Stephen Holden from The New York Times gave Blackwoods a positive review, describing it as "smarter and more diabolical than you could have guessed at the beginning." Lou Lumenick of the New York Post gave a more negative review, calling Blackwoods a "low rent, direct-to-video-caliber thriller."

It has an 11% 'rotten' rating on Rotten Tomatoes. Until Rampage in 2009, this film was known as Uwe Boll's "best" film.

References

External links 
 
 

2001 direct-to-video films
Films directed by Uwe Boll
2000s thriller films
Canadian direct-to-video films
2000s English-language films
English-language Canadian films
English-language German films
German horror films
Films shot in Vancouver
Films set in the United States
Canadian horror films
2001 films
2000s Canadian films
2000s German films